Wanding Border Economic Cooperation Zone (WTBECZ) is a Chinese State Council-approved Industrial Park based in Wanding Town, Ruili City, Dehong Prefecture, Yunnan, China, founded in 1992 and was established to promote trade between China and Myanmar. The zone spans 6 km sq. and is focused on developing trading, processing, agriculture resources and tourism.

See also
 Sino-Burmese relations
 Kunming Economic and Technology Development Zone
 Kunming High-tech Industrial Development Zone
 Hekou Border Economic Cooperation Zone
 Ruili Border Economic Cooperation Zone

References
Wanding Border Economic Cooperation Zone - Alibaba Group

Economy of Yunnan
Special Economic Zones of China
China–Myanmar border
Ruili